Allium monanthum, the Korean wild chive, is a spring vegetable with minuscule bulbous roots that have a mild onion flavor and found in the woodlands of Korea, Japan, northeastern Russia (Primorye), and northeastern China (Hebei, Heilongjiang, Jilin, Liaoning).

Description 
Allium monanthum is unusual in the genus in being usually dioecious (male and female flowers on separate plants), but rarely hermaphrodite or gynomonoecious. Leaves are flat, long and narrow, longer than the scape. Umbels are small, with one flower on pistillate (female) plants and 4-5 flowers on staminate (male) plants. All flowers are white, pink or red.

Culinary uses

Korea 
Called dallae in Korean, Korean wild chives are used in Korean herbal cooking alongside other san-namul (mountain vegetables) such as deodeok, angelica-tree, gondre and Siberian onion. Having a similar flavor profile to Tree onion, Korean wild chives can be eaten raw or blanched as a namul (seasoned herbal vegetable dish), pickled as a jangajji, or pan-fried to make buchimgae (pancake). As a herb, Korean wild chives make a good last minute addition to doenjang-jjigae (soybean paste stew) and other jjigae (stews). Soy sauce based dips are often flavored with Korean wild chives. In North Korea, radish water kimchi flavored with Korean wild chives is a popular spring banchan (side dish).

See also 
 Field garlic

References

External links 
 

monanthum
Flora of Eastern Asia
Flora of Manchuria
Flora of South-Central China
Flora of the Russian Far East
Korean vegetables
Namul
Onions
Plants described in 1886
Dioecious plants